Shahzadeh Mohammad may refer to:
Shahzadeh Mohammad, Kerman
Shahzadeh Mohammad, Khuzestan
Shahzadeh Mohammad, Boyer-Ahmad, Kohgiluyeh and Boyer-Ahmad Province